Iván Mesías Lehu (3 April 1935 – 19 December 2022) was a Chilean businessman politician who served as a Deputy between 1998 and 2002.

References

1935 births
2022 deaths
Chilean politicians
Members of the Chamber of Deputies of Chile
Radical Social Democratic Party of Chile politicians
Deputies of the L Legislative Period of the National Congress of Chile
People from Bío Bío Province